Hecate Strait (Haida language: K̲andaliig̲wii, also siigaay which means simply "ocean") is a wide but shallow strait between Haida Gwaii (formerly the Queen Charlotte Islands) and the mainland of British Columbia, Canada. It merges with Queen Charlotte Sound to the south and Dixon Entrance to the north.

Definition
According to the BCGNIS, the southern boundary of Hecate Strait is defined as a line running from the southernmost point of Price Island to Cape St James on Kunghit Island, the southernmost point of Haida Gwaii. The northern boundary is a line from Rose Point, the northeastern tip of Graham Island, to Hooper Point at the north end of Stephens Island off the mainland.

History
Hecate Strait, because it is so shallow, is especially susceptible to storms and violent weather. The Haida crossed the Hecate Strait to the mainland to plunder coastal villages to take slaves and booty. Only the Haida knew the real nature of the Strait's workings, and so could not be followed by the tribes of the mainland. Hecate Strait, therefore, was one of the main defenses of the Haida people from attack.

Hecate Strait was named by Captain George Henry Richards in 1861 or 1862 after his surveying vessel, HMS Hecate.

Geology
During the last ice age, the seafloor in this area was a wide coastal plain stretching south to the Olympic Peninsula and including what is now Queen Charlotte Sound.

Flora and fauna
The strait once contained strong salmon and halibut fisheries.

Hecate Strait is one of the few locations in the world with species from the glass sponge class of fauna. Regions with these sponge are currently protected from damage by commercial fishing.

The Hecate Strait and Queen Charlotte Sound Glass Sponge Reefs Marine Protected Area was designated by the Fisheries and Oceans Canada in February 2017. The MPA is located in the Northern Shelf bioregion of the Pacific Region, southeast of Haida Gwaii, North and South of the entrance to the Douglas Channel. The MPA is composed of three individual areas known as the Northern Reef, the Central Reefs, and the Southern Reef. Together these three areas cover approximately 2,410 square kilometers. The four reef complexes in the Hecate Strait and Queen Charlotte Sound discontinuously cover an area of about 1,000 km2, and are located in glacial troughs between 140 m and 240 m deep.

References

Straits of British Columbia
North Coast of British Columbia